Dlhé nad Cirochou is a village and municipality in  Snina District in the Prešov Region of north-eastern Slovakia.

History
In historical records the village was first mentioned in 1333.

Geography
The municipality lies at an altitude of 183 metres and covers an area of 26.301 km2. It has a population of about 2105 people.

Genealogical resources
The records for genealogical research are available at the state archive "Statny Archiv in Presov, Slovakia"

 Roman Catholic church records (births/marriages/deaths): 1805-1925 (parish A)
 Greek Catholic church records (births/marriages/deaths): 1825-1895 (parish B)

See also
 List of municipalities and towns in Slovakia

References

External links
 
 
https://web.archive.org/web/20071116010355/http://www.statistics.sk/mosmis/eng/run.html
Surnames of living people in Dlhe nad Cirochou

Villages and municipalities in Snina District
Zemplín (region)